"Make tha Trap Say Aye" is a song by American rapper OJ da Juiceman. It was released as his commercial debut single and included on his debut album, The Otha Side of the Trap. The song also features fellow Atlanta-based rapper and label-mate Gucci Mane. The song deals with drugs and dealing drugs.

Music video
OJ is seen rapping in a traphouse with Gucci Mane in front of a bunch of Atlanta-based rappers. Gucci is then seen rapping in front of a store & with OJ. Cameo appearances in the video include Nicki Minaj, Waka Flocka Flame, Frenchie, Wooh Da Kid, Kayo Redd and Shawty Lo.

Remixes and freestyles
The official remix features Cam'ron and Tony Yayo. Rick Ross has also made a freestyle over the song.

Chart performance

Weekly charts

Year-end charts

References

2007 songs
OJ da Juiceman songs
Gucci Mane songs
2008 debut singles
Songs about drugs
Songs written by Gucci Mane
Song recordings produced by Zaytoven
Songs written by Zaytoven
Gangsta rap songs